Gustav Wang (born 13 June 2003) is a Danish road cyclist riding for UCI Continental Team . He won the men's junior time trial at the 2021 UCI Road World Championships.

Major results
2019
 1st  Time trial, National Junior Road Championships
2020
 National Junior Road Championships
1st  Time trial
2nd Road race
 3rd Overall Visegrad 4 Juniors
2021
 1st  Time trial, UCI Junior Road World Championships
 1st Stage 1 Aubel–Thimister–Stavelot
 2nd Time trial, National Junior Road Championships
 4th Chrono des Nations Juniors

References

External links

2003 births
Living people
Danish male cyclists